Brantville is a neighbourhood in the Regional Municipality of Grand Tracadie–Sheila, in Northumberland County, New Brunswick, Canada.

It is named for the brant goose. Brant Island is located offshore.

History

Notable people

See also
List of communities in New Brunswick

References
 

Designated places in New Brunswick
Former municipalities in New Brunswick
Former local service districts of New Brunswick
Neighbourhoods in Grand Tracadie-Sheila